Nara Dada (also known as 228 GB (Gugera Branch) is a village in Faisalabad District, Punjab, Pakistan on the Gojra - Samundari road.

The exact history is not known, but this village existed before the independence of Pakistan. Most of the inhabitants came to live there following migration from the villages 'Nara' and 'Dada', in the Indian district of Hushiarpur — the village's name is a combination of these names. This is the village of Rajputs of 'Naru' and 'Ambala' caste.

There are four mosques in Naradada. Jamia Masjid situated in the middle of the village, rebuilt in 2018. Most of the inhabitants are Muslim Rajputs who fled from anti-Muslim pogroms in India. There is also a small number of Christians living there.

Nara Dada is located near a road and acts as a hub to villages in the region. The land surrounding the village is not very fertile, and crops like wheat, sugarcane, and maize is grown there.

References

Villages in Faisalabad District